The list of awards and nominations received by Stockard Channing includes three Emmy Awards (out of fourteen nominations), two Screen Actors Guild Awards (out of eleven nominations), one Drama Desk Award (out of seven nominations), as well one Tony Award (out of seven nominations). Among others, she has also won four Online Film & Television Association Awards (out of seven nominations), two Blockbuster Entertainment Awards, a CableACE Award, a Drama League Award, a GLAAD Media Award, a London Film Critics' Circle Award, a National Board of Review Award, a People's Choice Award, and a Lucy Award. In 2003, Channing was inducted into the American Theater Hall of Fame.

An Academy Awards-nominee, she has also received three nominations for Golden Globe Awards, two nominations for Satellite Awards, one nomination from American Film Institute, one nomination from Chicago Film Critics Association, also one nomination from National Society of Film Critics and San Francisco Film Critics Circle, one Golden Apple Award-nomination, one Film Independent Spirit Award-nomination, one Outer Critics Circle Award-nomination and one TV Guide Award-nomination. As of September 2014, Channing has accumulated 21 awards out of 71 nominations.

Film and television awards

Academy Awards

American Film Institute Awards

Blockbuster Entertainment Awards

CableACE Awards

Chicago Film Critics Association Awards

Emmy Awards

Film Independent Spirit Awards

GLAAD Media Awards

Golden Apple Awards

Golden Globe Awards

London Film Critics' Circle Awards

National Board of Review Awards

National Society of Film Critics Awards

People's Choice Awards

San Francisco International Film Festival Awards

Satellite Awards

Screen Actors Guild Awards

TV Guide Awards

Women in Film and Television International Awards

Theatre awards

American Theater Hall of Fame

Drama Desk Awards

Drama League Awards

Outer Critics Circle Awards

Tony Awards

Other Awards

Grammy Awards

See also 
Stockard Channing filmography

References 

"Stockard Channing – Milestones". TCM Movie Database. TBS. tcm.com. Retrieved September 12, 2014.

External links
 
 
 
 

Channing, Stockard